Malikipuram Mandal is one of the 22 mandals in Konaseema district of Andhra Pradesh. As per census 2011, there are 11 villages in this Mandal.

Demographics 
Malikipuram Mandal has total population of 75,847 as per the Census 2011 out of which 37,989 are males while 37,858 are females. The average Sex Ratio of Malikipuram Mandal is 997. The total literacy rate of Malikipuram Mandal is 81%.

Towns and villages

Villages 
1. Gudapalli
2. Gudimellanka
3. Irusumanda
4. Kattiwanda
5. Kesanapalle
6. Lakkavaram
7. Malikipuram
8. Mattaparru
9. Ramarajulanka
10. Sankaraguptam
11. Visveswarapuram 
12. Chintalamori
13. Toorpupalem
14. DHINDI

See also 
List of mandals in Andhra Pradesh

References 

Mandals in Konaseema district
Mandals in Andhra Pradesh